The 1968 Texas gubernatorial election was held on November 5, 1968, to elect the governor of Texas. Incumbent Democratic Governor John Connally did not run for reelection to a fourth term, so the election pitted Democrat Preston Smith against Republican Paul Eggers. Smith was easily elected, winning 57% of the vote to Eggers' 43%.

Primaries

Republican

Democratic

Results

References

1968
Texas
November 1968 events in the United States
1968 Texas elections